The Stone House is an historic house located on Burnham Road in Bridgton, Maine, United States.  Built 1828–1830, it is a rare example in Maine of a Cape style house built out of stone in the English masonry style.  It was listed on the National Register of Historic Places in 1984.

Description and history
The Stone House stands in a rural part of southern Bridgton, on the north side of Burnham Road, a short way west of its junction with 
Willis Park Road.  The house is built on a sloping lot, and presents a single story to the south and two stories to the north.  It is built out of slabs of granite hand-quarried from a local quarry, with a timber-frame half story.  It has a gabled roof and a central brick chimney, and modern ells extend the building to the west.  Its main facade is five bays wide, with a center entrance framed by sidelight windows.

The house was built in 1828-30 by John Mead, Sr., an Englishman who settled here in the early 1800s.  In 1828, his house was destroyed by a freak windstorm, and he decided to build a house that was capable of withstanding such events.  It is the only house known in western Maine that uses English masonry methods.  Mead was also engaged in the only known instance in the state of planting mulberry trees for the purpose of cultivating silk worms.

See also
National Register of Historic Places listings in Cumberland County, Maine

References

Houses completed in 1830
Houses on the National Register of Historic Places in Maine
Houses in Cumberland County, Maine
Buildings and structures in Bridgton, Maine
1830 establishments in Maine
National Register of Historic Places in Cumberland County, Maine